Emre Bayav (born July 14, 1987) is a Turkish professional basketball player who last played for Beşiktaş of the Turkish Basketball Super League (BSL).

Professional career 
Bayav began his basketball career at Istanbul Technical University team. After playing for junior team of Crvena zvezda in Serbia, he returned to Turkey and transferred to Efes Pilsen. He was then on loan at Pertevniyal, Pınar Karşıyaka, Darüşşafaka Cooper Tires as well as Aliağa Petkim. He transferred in the 2012–13 season to Erdemirspor from Pınar Karşıyaka, where he played from 2010 to 2012. In July 2015, he signed with Beşiktaş.

References

External links
 Eurobasket.com profile
 FIBA.com profile
 TBLStat.net profile

1987 births
Living people
Aliağa Petkim basketball players
Anadolu Efes S.K. players
Competitors at the 2013 Mediterranean Games
Darüşşafaka Basketbol players
Gaziantep Basketbol players
Karşıyaka basketball players
KK Crvena zvezda players
Mediterranean Games gold medalists for Turkey
Turkish men's basketball players
Turkish expatriate basketball people in Serbia
Pertevniyal S.K. players
Mediterranean Games medalists in basketball
Centers (basketball)